Jose "Joboy" Sabijon Aquino II (born March 18, 1956) is a Filipino politician. A member of the Lakas–CMD Party, he was elected as a Member of the House of Representatives of the Philippines, representing the 1st District of Agusan del Norte beginning in 2007. In 2013, he was lost by Ferdinand Amante, Jr. in a mayoral election. In 2016, he is now the Vice Mayor of Butuan on May 10, 2016.

References
 

People from Agusan del Norte
1956 births
Living people
Lakas–CMD (1991) politicians
Lakas–CMD politicians
Members of the House of Representatives of the Philippines from Agusan del Norte
People from Butuan